Caroline Munro (born 16 January 1949) is an English actress, model and singer known for her many appearances in horror, science fiction and action films of the 1970s and 1980s. In 2019, she was inducted into the Rondo Hatton Classic Horror Awards' Monster Kid Hall of Fame.

Early life and education
Born in Windsor, Berkshire, Munro was the youngest child of a lawyer and a housewife. As a young child, Munro and her family moved to Rottingdean, near Brighton where she attended a convent school.

Career
Munro's career began in 1966 when her mother and a photographer friend entered some headshots of her in The Evening Newss "Face of the Year" contest:

This led to modelling work for Vogue magazine at the age of 17. She moved to London to pursue modelling work and became a cover girl for fashion and television advertisements while there. She had bit parts in films such as Casino Royale (1967) and Where's Jack? (1969). One of her photo advertisements led to a screen test and a one-year contract with Paramount where she was cast as Richard Widmark's daughter in the comedy western A Talent for Loving (also 1969). Photographs of Munro were used to portray Victoria Regina Phibes, the wife of the title character (played by Vincent Price) in The Abominable Dr Phibes (1971), and its sequel, Dr Phibes Rises Again (1972).

Hammer Horror films
The chairman of Hammer Films, Sir James Carreras, spotted Munro on a Lamb's Navy Rum poster/billboard. He asked his assistant, James Liggett, to find and screen test her. She was promptly signed to a one-year contract. Her first film for Hammer proved to be a turning point in her career. It was during the making of Dracula AD 1972 (1972) that she decided from this film onward she was a fully-fledged actress. Munro acted in Captain Kronos – Vampire Hunter (1974). Directed by Brian Clemens, she played the barefoot gypsy girl Carla. In Paramount Pictures' DVD commentary, Clemens explains that he envisioned the role as a fiery Raquel Welch-type redhead.

Munro has the distinction of being the only actor ever signed to a long-term contract by Hammer Films. She turned down the lead female roles in Hammer's Dr. Jekyll and Sister Hyde (1971), Frankenstein and the Monster from Hell (1974), the unmade Vampirella, Force 10 from Navarone (1978) and The World Is Full of Married Men (1979) as they all required nudity.

The Golden Voyage of Sinbad

Brian Clemens helped her to be cast in the role of Margiana, the slave girl in The Golden Voyage of Sinbad (1973).

Munro has served as a trustee of the Ray and Diana Harryhausen Foundation.

Other appearances during this time included I Don't Want to Be Born (1975) with Joan Collins, and At the Earth's Core (1976) with Peter Cushing and Doug McClure. She appeared also as Tammy, a nursing employee of a sinister health farm, in "The Angels of Death", an episode of the TV series The New Avengers that featured also rising stars Pamela Stephenson and Lindsay Duncan.

Late 1970s and 1980s
In 1977, Munro turned down the opportunity to play villainess Ursa in Superman in favour of Bond girl Naomi in The Spy Who Loved Me.

Munro continued to work in numerous British and European horror and science fiction films throughout the 1970s and 1980s, such as Starcrash (1978) with David Hasselhoff, Christopher Plummer and Marjoe Gortner.

Munro's career continued to thrive well in the 1980s, and she appeared in many slasher and Eurotrash productions. Her first film shot on American soil was the William Lustig production Maniac (1980). This was soon followed by the "multi-award winning, shot during the Cannes Film Festival" shocker The Last Horror Film (1982) (directed by David Winters), in which she was reunited with her Maniac (and Starcrash) co-star Joe Spinell. She had a cameo role in the film Don't Open Till Christmas (1984), Slaughter High (1986), Paul Naschy's Howl of the Devil, and Jess Franco's Faceless (1988), followed in rapid succession. She reteamed with Starcrash director Luigi Cozzi for Demons 6: De Profundis (aka Il gatto nero, 1989).

Between 1984 and 1987, Munro was a hostess on the Yorkshire Television game show 3-2-1. Munro was a popular pin-up girl during this time, although she refused to pose nude. In the early 1980s, she appeared in music videos for Adam Ant's "Goody Two Shoes" (1982) and Meat Loaf's "If You Really Want To" (1983).

Since 1990
Munro's film roles were confined to performing cameos as herself in Night Owl (1993), as Mrs. Pignon in To Die For (1994), as the counselor in her friend Jeffrey Arsenault's film Domestic Strangers (1996), and as Carla the Gypsy in Flesh for the Beast (2003).

In 2018, Munro re-teamed with her Dracula A.D. 1972 co-star Christopher Neame to appear in the horror film House of the Gorgon (2018).

In September 2021, Munro started presenting Talking Pictures TV’s new, exclusive series The Cellar Club. In the series, Caroline introduces celebrated and obscure horror films from her Cellar Club and gives her personal, insider perspective.

Music
An early effort of Munro's was a single release by Columbia, "Tar and Cement", backed with "The Sporting Life". The musicians who played on the recording included Eric Clapton, Jack Bruce, and Ginger Baker.

"You Got It", backed with "Where Does Love Begin"
"Rhythm Of The Rain", backed with Sound Of The Rain"
"Love Songs", backed with "Sound Of The Sun"

In 1984, Munro collaborated with Gary Numan for the single "Pump Me Up", which was released on Numan's Numa record label.

Filmography

Film

Television

Short film

Discography

References

External links

Caroline Munro at HorrorStars
Interview (2007) at Den Of Geek
Interview (2008) at Zani
The Caroline Munro Diaries

1949 births
English film actresses
English television actresses
English female models
English game show hosts
Living people
People from Windsor, Berkshire
20th-century English actresses
21st-century English actresses
English women pop singers